Lewis Howe Gilbert, Jr. (born May 24, 1956) is an American former college and professional football player who was a tight end in the National Football League (NFL) for three seasons in the late 1970s and early 1980s.  He played college football for the University of Florida.  Undrafted in the 1978 NFL Draft, Howe signed with the NFL's Atlanta Falcons as a free agent, and played for four different NFL teams in four years.

Gilbert was born in Naples, Florida.  He attended Naples High School, and played for the Naples Golden Eagles high school football team.

While attending the University of Florida, he was a three-year letterman for coach Doug Dickey's Florida Gators football team from 1974 to 1977.  As a senior, he started all eleven games for the Gators.  He graduated from the University of Florida with a bachelor's degree in exercise and sport science in 1978.  In 1979, Gilbert returned to Gainesville to serve as a graduate assistant for the Gators under new head coach Charley Pell.

As a professional free agent, Gilbert appeared in nineteen NFL games in four seasons, including four games for the Atlanta Falcons in 1978, three games for the Philadelphia Eagles in 1980, six games for the San Francisco 49ers in 1980, and six games for the Los Angeles Rams in 1981.  Employed mostly as a blocking end, he had one career reception for seven yards in 1980.

See also 

 Florida Gators football, 1970–79

References 

1956 births
Living people
American football tight ends
Atlanta Falcons players
Florida Gators football players
Naples High School alumni
Philadelphia Eagles players
San Francisco 49ers players
St. Louis Rams players
Sportspeople from Naples, Florida
Players of American football from Florida
Tampa Bay Bandits players